Oecanthus mhatreae, the Otomí tree cricket, is a species of tree cricket in the family Gryllidae. It is found in Querétaro, Mexico. Its common name comes from the indigenous Otomi people who are native to the Mexican Plateau region, and its scientific name was given in honour of Natasha Mhatre, a noted Indian Biologist and Professor at University of Western Ontario in Canada.

References 

Oecanthus